The list of shipwrecks in 1946 includes ships sunk, foundered, grounded, or otherwise lost during 1946.

January

1 January

2 January

3 January

5 January

6 January

7 January

8 January

11 January

14 January

15 January

18 January

20 January

24 January

27 January

28 January

29 January

30 January

Unknown date

February

1 February

2 February

3 February

4 February

5 February

6 February

8 February

10 February

11 February

12 February

14 February

15 February

16 February

17 February

19 February

21 February

24 February

25 February

28 February

Unknown date

March

1 March

2 March

4 March

5 March

 On 22 July 1967, attempted removal of the wreck caused a major explosion, damaging property onshore.

6 March

9 March

11 March

16 March

17 March

25 March

26 March

27 March

30 March

April

1 April

2 April

4 April

5 April

8 April

9 April

14 April

15 April

16 April

17 April

21 April

24 April

26 April

28 April

30 April

Unknown date

May

1 May

2 May

6 May

8 May

9 May

10 May

14 May

18 May

21 May

23 May

24 May

25 May

26 May

28 May

31 May

Unknown date

June

4 June

6 June

7 June

8 June

9 June

13 June

16 June

18 June

20 June

25 June

28 June

Unknown date

July

1 July

2 July

7 July

11 July

12 July

13 July

14 July

18 July

20 July

22 July

25 July

26 July

27 July

30 July

31 July

Unknown date

August

1 August

2 August

5 August

7 August

10 August

16 August

20 August

22 August

25 August

Unknown date

September

3 September

8 September

12 September

13 September

15 September

19 September

20 September

24 September

25 September

29 September

30 September

Unknown date

October

1 October

10 October

11 October

12 October

14 October

17 October

19 October

22 October

24 October

26 October

28 October

29 October

Unknown date

November

2 November

3 November

4 November

5 November

11 November

13 November

14 November

16 November

19 November

20 November

22 November

26 November

27 November

Unknown date

December

1 December

2 December

5 December

6 December

7 December

8 December

13 December

16 December

19 December

20 December

21 December

22 December

23 December

24 December

25 December

27 December

30 December

31 December

Unknown date

Unknown date

See also
 Lists of shipwrecks

References

shipwrecks
1946
Ships